Alfred or Alf Phillips may refer to:

Alfred N. Phillips (1894–1970), U.S. Representative from Connecticut
Alfred Phillips (diver) Sr. (1908–1994), Canadian diver and curler
Alf Phillips Jr. (born ), Canadian curler, his son
Alfred Phillips (Arena football), Utah Blaze player